The 4 × 5 kilometre cross-country skiing event was the only relay event of the women's cross-country skiing programme at the 1984 Winter Olympics, in Sarajevo, Yugoslavia. It was the eighth appearance of the 4 x 5 km relay in the Winter Olympics. The competition was held on Wednesday, February 15, 1984 at Veliko Polje, Igman.

It was the first time since 1968 that Norway won the gold medal in the event.

Results

References

External links
Official Olympic Report

Women's cross-country skiing at the 1984 Winter Olympics
Women's 4 × 5 kilometre relay cross-country skiing at the Winter Olympics
Oly
Cross